Catherine Grosjean (or Grojean) (born 24 April 1947) is a French former swimmer. She competed in two events at the 1968 Summer Olympics.

References

External links
 

1947 births
Living people
French female butterfly swimmers
French female freestyle swimmers
Olympic swimmers of France
Swimmers at the 1968 Summer Olympics
Sportspeople from Casablanca